Martin Quigley Jr. (November 24, 1917 – February 5, 2011) was a publisher of film magazines, an author and a politician twice elected mayor of Larchmont, New York.

Journalism and publishing
He was the son of Martin Quigley (1890–1964). His father had been a founder of developer of motion picture trade periodicals including the Motion Picture Herald and an active proponent and co-author of the Motion Picture Production Code, which governed the content of Hollywood movies from the 1930s to the 1960s.

The younger Quigley became very active in the editing and publication of those periodicals from young adulthood, also attempting to maintain the influence of the Code, especially in the 1960s, as it faded into irrelevance as moral standards changed.

Espionage
During World War II, he used his publishing position as a cover to gather intelligence in Ireland, which remained neutral during the Second World War, and in Italy, on behalf of the US Office of Strategic Services (OSS).

Authorship
Books written or cowritten by him include these:
 Magic Shadows - The History of the Origin of Motion Pictures (1948) 
 Catholic Action in Practice: Family, Life, Education, International Life (1963, co-written with Msgr. Edward M. Connors) 
 Peace Without Hiroshima (1991) 
 A U.S. Spy in Ireland (1999)

Personal life
His father was an important publisher of film magazines. He was a devout Catholic and active in Church activities. He was twice elected mayor of Larchmont, New York.

Notes

1917 births
2011 deaths
American magazine publishers (people)
American magazine editors
American film historians
American male non-fiction writers
American non-fiction writers
American film critics
American Roman Catholics
Writers from Chicago
Georgetown University alumni
Columbia University alumni
People of the Office of Strategic Services
World War II spies for the United States
Historians from Illinois